Labicymbium avium is a species of sheet weaver found in Ecuador. It was described by Millidge in 1991.

References

Linyphiidae
Spiders described in 1991
Endemic fauna of Ecuador
Spiders of South America